The Fort Antoine Theatre is a small amphitheatre on the Avenue de la Quarantaine in the Monaco-Ville ward of Monaco. The fort hosts open air plays in the summer months.

The theatre was originally constructed as a fortress in the early 18th-century before its destruction in 1944. Prince Rainier III had the fortress rebuilt as a theatre in 1953. The parapet of the fort is provided by pittosporum hedges. The militaristic nature of its architecture has been retained with a bartizan and a pyramid of cannonballs at the centre of the theatre.

References

External links

18th-century fortifications
Theatres completed in 1853
1953 establishments in Monaco
Amphitheaters
Coastal fortifications
Fortifications in Monaco
Theatres in Monaco
Monaco-Ville